Bidache is a town and commune in the Pyrénées-Atlantiques department of south western France. Between 1570 and 1793 it was the centre of the sovereign Principality of Bidache.

See also
Communes of the Pyrénées-Atlantiques department

References

Communes of Pyrénées-Atlantiques
Lower Navarre
Pyrénées-Atlantiques communes articles needing translation from French Wikipedia